Damone Clark (born June 28, 2000) is an American football linebacker for the Dallas Cowboys of the National Football League (NFL). He played college football at LSU.

Early life and high school
Clark was born and lived in New Orleans until his family was displaced by Hurricane Katrina in 2005 and moved to Baton Rouge, Louisiana. He attended Southern University Laboratory School. Clark had 48 tackles, five tackles for loss, and four sacks with four interceptions in his junior season.

College career
Clark played in 12 games during his freshman season on special teams and as a reserve linebacker behind starter Devin White. He played in all 15 of LSU's games with three starts as a sophomore and had 49 tackles and 3.5 sacks as the Tigers won the 2020 College Football Playoff National Championship. Clark was chosen to wear the No. 18 Jersey by the Tigers' coaching staff going into his junior season. He finished the season tied for the team lead with 63 tackles.

Professional career

Clark was drafted by the Dallas Cowboys in the fifth round, 176th overall, of the 2022 NFL Draft.

References

External links
 Dallas Cowboys bio
LSU Tigers bio

2000 births
Living people
Players of American football from New Orleans
American football linebackers
LSU Tigers football players
Players of American football from Baton Rouge, Louisiana
Dallas Cowboys players